Umbundu, or South Mbundu (autonym ), one of many Bantu languages, is the most widely-spoken autochthonous language of Angola. Its speakers are known as Ovimbundu and are an ethnic group constituting a third of Angola's population. Their homeland is the Central Highlands of Angola and the coastal region west of these highlands, including the cities of Benguela and Lobito. Because of recent internal migration, there are now also large communities in the capital Luanda and its surrounding province, as well as in Lubango.

Phonology

Consonants

Vowels

Tone 
Umbundu has two tones: low and high. The first acute accent (á) in a word represents a high tone. The low tone is represented by a grave accent (à). Unmarked syllables carry the same tone as the preceding syllable.

Vocabulary
Welcome –  ('The guests has come')
Hello –  (sg);  (pl)
How are you? –  (sg);  (pl)
I'm fine thanks, and you? –  ('I'm fine');  ('We're fine')
What's your name? –  (frm);  (inf)
My name is... – 
Where are you from? –  ('Where is your country?')
I'm from... –  ('My country is...')
Good morning – 
Good afternoon – 
Good evening – 
Good night –  ('Sleep well')
Goodbye –  ('I went')
Do you speak English? – 
Do you speak Umbundu? – 
Sorry –  (sg);  (pl)
Please –  ('Give me pity')
Thank you –  (sg);  (pl)
Reply –

Sample text
Omanu vosi vacitiwa valipwa kwenda valisoka kovina vyosikwenda komoko. Ovo vakwete esunga kwenda, kwenda olondunge kwenje ovo vatêla okuliteywila kuvamwe kwenda vakwavo vesokolwilo lyocisola.

Translation: All human beings are born free and equal in dignity and rights. They are endowed with reason and conscience and should act towards one another in a spirit of brotherhood. 
(Article 1 of the Universal Declaration of Human Rigquehts)

References

Further reading

External links
English-Umbundu language resources on the web (Mofeko)
Educação  – Umbundu lessons at Nação Ovimbundu
Umbundu – alphabet at omniglot.com
Dictionary Umbundu – Medical Hospital Nossa Senhora da Paz, Cubal, Angola.

 
Njila languages
Languages of Angola
Languages of Namibia